Charleville-sous-Bois is a commune in the Moselle department in Grand Est in north-eastern France.

Localities of the commune:  Épange, Mussy-l’Évêque, Nidange, Rénange, Saint-Michel.

See also
 Communes of the Moselle department

References

External links
 

Charlesvillesousbois